The United States Court of Appeals for the Third Circuit (in case citations, 3d Cir.) is a federal court with appellate jurisdiction over the district courts for the following districts:
 District of Delaware
 District of New Jersey
 Eastern District of Pennsylvania
 Middle District of Pennsylvania
 Western District of Pennsylvania

This circuit also hears appeals from the District Court of the Virgin Islands, which is an Article VI territorial court and not a district court under Article III of the Constitution.

The court is composed of 14 active judges and is based at the James A. Byrne United States Courthouse in Philadelphia, Pennsylvania. The court also conducts sittings in other venues, including the United States Virgin Islands. It is one of 13 United States courts of appeals. Due to the court's appellate jurisdiction over Delaware (where more than half of publicly-traded companies in the United States incorporate), the court handles a significant number of influential commercial cases in the United States.

Current composition of the court 

:

Vacancies and pending nominations

List of former judges

Chief judges

Succession of seats

See also 
 Judicial appointment history for United States federal courts#Third Circuit
 List of current United States Circuit Judges

References

External links 
 
 Recent opinions from Findlaw

 
Newark, New Jersey
1891 establishments in the United States
Courts and tribunals established in 1891